Bazargarah Molla Aqa (also Romanized as Bazargarāh Mollā Āqā) is a village in Chelo Rural District, Chelo District, Andika County, Khuzestan Province, Iran. At the 2006 census, its population was 75, in 15 families.

References 

Populated places in Andika County